St. Denis is an unincorporated community in the Rural Municipality of Grant No. 372, in the province of Saskatchewan, Canada. The community was founded in 1910. A post office was established at St. Denis in 1909 but it closed in 1911. Leon Denis was postmaster. The post office was located on the Leon Denis homestead at NE 24-37-R1 w 3rd meridian.

St. Denis maintains close cultural ties with the nearby communities of Prud'homme and Vonda. The three communities were originally settled by French speaking settlers in the early 1900s.

See also 

 List of communities in Saskatchewan
 Hamlets of Saskatchewan

References

External links

Grant No. 372, Saskatchewan
Unincorporated communities in Saskatchewan
Division No. 15, Saskatchewan